During the decade, Russ Jackson never missed a game due to injury. Every year in the decade, Jackson led the Rough Riders to the playoffs. From 1963 to 1969, he was the Eastern Division Passing Leader.

1960

1961

Schedule

Awards and honors

1962

Schedule

Awards and honors
Russ Jackson, QB, Eastern Division All-Star

1963

In 1963, Russ Jackson was the first double winner of the Schenley Outstanding Canadian and Outstanding Player Awards.

Schedule

Awards and honors
 CFL's Most Outstanding Player Award – Russ Jackson (QB)
 CFL's Most Outstanding Canadian Award – Russ Jackson (QB)
Russ Jackson, QB, Eastern Division All-Star
Russ Jackson, CFL Passing Yards Leader
Russ Jackson, CFL Pass Attempts Leader

1964

Schedule

Awards and honors
Russ Jackson, CFL Passing Yards Leader

1965

Schedule

Awards and honors
Russ Jackson, CFL Passing Yards Leader

1966

Schedule

Awards and honors
 CFL's Most Outstanding Player Award – Russ Jackson (QB)
 CFL's Most Outstanding Canadian Award – Russ Jackson (QB)
 CFL's Coach of the Year – Frank Clair
Russ Jackson, QB, Eastern Division All-Star
Russ Jackson, CFL Passing Yards Leader
Russ Jackson, CFL Pass Attempts Leader

CFL All-Stars
Russ Jackson, QB

1967

1968

1969

References